Peter Hänggi (born November 29, 1950) is a theoretical physicist from Switzerland, Professor of Theoretical Physics at the University of Augsburg. He is best known for his original works on Brownian motion and the Brownian motor concept, stochastic resonance and dissipative systems (classical and quantum mechanical). Other topics include, driven quantum tunneling, such as the discovery of coherent destruction of tunneling (CDT), phononics, relativistic statistical mechanics and the foundations of classical and quantum thermodynamics.

Career
He studied physics and was awarded B.Sc (1972), M.Sc (1974) and Ph.D. (1977) at the University of Basel.

He was a Postgraduate Research Associate at the University of California, San Diego (1979–80), Assistant Professor of Physics, Polytechnic Institute of New York, New York (1980–1983), Associate Professor, Polytechnic Institute of New York, New York (1983–1987) and full professor at the University of Augsburg (1986 to present).

His main research interest is in theoretical statistical mechanics and quantum mechanics.

Hänggi's Law 
The following statement is attributed as Hänggi's Law:

It is labeled as a kind of Murphy's law and it was first seen in Arthur Bloch's work. However, the attribute's relation to Professor Hänggi's research is not clear.

Corollaries:
 The more vital your research, the fewer people will understand it.
 You write a nontrivial paper and you likely will be the only one who will remember it.

Honors and awards
He was elected a Fellow of the American Physical Society in 1988 "for distinguished contributions to nonlinear statistical physics and reaction rate theory and for elucidating the influence of non-Markovian memory effects and dissipative tunneling in equilibrium and non equilibrium systems".

In 2003, he was elected to membership in the German National Academy of Sciences Leopoldina, 2005 elected membership in American Association for the Advancement of Sciences (AAAS), 2010 elected membership in the Academia Europaea (AE), 2014 elected membership in European Academy of Sciences (EURASC) and in 2015 elected foreign honorary membership in the Academiei Române. He been honored with over 10 doctor honorary causa (Dr. h.c.) degrees. 

Peter Hänggi is a recipient of a number of scientific awards including

 Lindhard Lecture (2010), 
 Lars Onsager Lecture and Onsager Medal (2011), 
 Blaise Pascal Medal (2018), 
 Smoluchowski Medal from Jagiellonian University (2006), 
 2019 Marian Smoluchowski and Emil Warburg Prize for Physics by the German Physical Society (DPG) and the Polish Physical Society (PTF), and
 2023 Lars Onsager prize recipient of the American Physical Society (APS) for "For the development of Brownian motors and pioneering contributions to nonequilibrium statistical physics, relativistic and quantum thermodynamics."

Notable review papers 
 Reaction-rate theory: fifty years after Kramers
 Stochastic resonance
 Artificial Brownian motors: controlling transport on the nanoscale
 Quantum fluctuation relations: Foundations and applications
Phononics: manipulating heat flow with electronic analogs and beyond
 Driven quantum tunnelling
 Statistical mechanics and thermodynamics at strong coupling: quantum and classical

References

External links
 Homepage
 brief CV, data on Publons

1950 births
Living people
Swiss physicists
Theoretical physicists
University of Basel alumni
Polytechnic Institute of New York University alumni
Academic staff of the University of Augsburg
Fellows of the American Physical Society